Walshe is a surname, a variant of Walsh, meaning "Wales", i.e. "foreigner" (non-English) originating in Wales, brought to Ireland by Normans. It is most common in County Mayo and County Kilkenny. There are other variants including "Welsh". Walshe is uncommon as a given name.

Notable people with this name
 Damian Walshe-Howling
 Dylan Walshe
 Francis Walshe
 Gwenethe Walshe
 James Walshe (1803–1888), catholic priest and Bishop in Kildare and Leighlin
 Jennifer Walshe
 Joe Walshe
 John Walshe (disambiguation)
 Joseph Walshe, (1886–1956), Irish civil servant
 Nick Walshe (born 1974), former rugby union footballer
 Pat Walshe

See also
 Walsh (disambiguation)
 Walsh (surname)
 Welsh (surname)

References